The following highways are numbered 541:

United States